Colégio Diocesano de São José 5 (CDSJ5) is a Roman Catholic preschool through secondary school in Nossa Senhora de Fátima (Our Lady of Fatima Parish), Macau. It is operated by the Roman Catholic Diocese of Macau and it is a member of the Macau Catholic Schools Association. The school is not a part of Macau's tuition-free education network.

In 2015 and early 2016 the tuition ranged from 28,900 to 32,200 Macau patacas. As of May 2016 the tuition was to increase to a range of 31,900 to 36,400 patacas. In 2016 several parents protested the tuition hike by sending a letter to Stephen Lee, the Bishop of Macau.

References

External links

 Colégio Diocesano de São José 5
 Colégio Diocesano de São José 5 

Catholic schools in Macau
Catholic secondary schools in Macau